Blood Feud is a 1961 Italian film starring Belinda Lee. 

It was also known as Il sicario, The Killer and The Hit Man.

Premise
Riccardo, a debt-ridden industrialist decides to kill his creditor. He hires Torelli, an old employee, who works as a mechanic and needs money.

Cast
 Belinda Lee as Ileana Torelli
 Sylva Koscina as Carla
 Sergio Fantoni as Riccardo
 Alberto Lupo as Giulio Torelli
 Pietro Germi as Bolognesi
 Andrea Checchi as Frisler
Lauro Gazzolo
Margarita Puratich
Bianca Doria

Production
It was the second film directed by Damiano Damiani and was shot at Cinecitta Studios in Rome. It was one of Belinda Lee's last roles.

References

External links
Il Sicario (Italian title) at BFI
Blood Feud at IMDb
Blood Feud at Letterbox DVD

1961 films
Films directed by Damiano Damiani
Italian drama films
1960s Italian-language films
1960s Italian films